The 1915 Dartmouth football team was an American football team that represented Dartmouth College as an independent during the 1915 college football season. In its fifth season under head coach Frank Cavanaugh, the team compiled a 7–1–1 record and outscored opponents by a total of 194 to 40. John B. McAuliffe was the team captain.

Schedule

References

Dartmouth
Dartmouth Big Green football seasons
Dartmouth football